Harkatta is a village in Nawalparasi District in the Lumbini Zone of southern Nepal.

References

Populated places in Parasi District